Khndzorut is a village in the Vayk Municipality of the Vayots Dzor Province of Armenia. The village is located close to the Armenia–Azerbaijan border. Northwest to the village is the abandoned site of Horadis, with a church from 1668.

Etymology 

References

External links 
 
 
 

Populated places in Vayots Dzor Province